Doloroso may refer to:
 doloroso, musical terminology
Doloroso, Mississippi, a town in the United States